Filip Bundgaard Kristensen (born 3 July 2004) is a Danish professional footballer who plays as a winger for Danish Superliga club Randers. He represents Denmark at under-19 level.

Club career
Bundgaard progressed through the youth academy of Randers FC, after he started playing football for Hornbæk SF and Randers Freja. He made 28 appearances for the under-17 team, scoring 16 goals between 2018 and 2021. In the 2020–21 season, he scored five goals in 15 appearances for the under-19 side. 

On 5 July 2020, Bundgaard made his professional debut for Randers' first team, coming on as a substitute in the 90th minute alongside his brother Oliver Bundgaard, in the 3–2 Danish Superliga relegation group win over Hobro IK. Thereby, he became the youngest ever Randers' player and the second youngest ever player in Superliga history, behind only Jeppe Kjær. This remained his only appearance during the 2019–20 season.

He signed his first professional contract on 30 September 2020, a three-year deal keeping him at the club until 2023. In the 2020–21 season, Bundgaard made eleven total appearances. He scored his first goal for the club on 10 November 2020 in a Danish Cup win over Aarhus Fremad, becoming Randers' youngest ever goalscorer as well as the youngest ever goalscorer in the cup. He also won his first trophy at the end of the season, as Randers beat SønderjyskE by 4–0 in the final.

Bundgaard made his European debut on 19 August 2021, coming off the bench in the 76th minute for Vito Hammershøy-Mistrati in a 1–1 draw in the UEFA Europa League qualifier against Turkish club Galatasaray.

On 17 October 2022, he extended his contract with Randers until 2026, after becoming a regular starter for the club as an 18-year-old.

International career
Bundgaard made his debut for Denmark under-16s on 26 November 2019, starting in a 1–1 friendly draw against Portugal in Antalya, Turkey, under national team coach Søren Hermansen. He made his first appearance at under-17 level the following year, on 10 September 2020, in a friendly against Germany in Aabenraa.

After one appearance for the under-17s, Bundgaard was included in the Denmark under-18 squad, making his debut in a friendly against Norway on 4 September 2021 in Selånger, Sweden. He scored his first international goal on 28 March 2022 for the under-18s in a friendly against England, his shot squirming through the arms of goalkeeper Max Thompson shortly before the break in an eventual 3–3 draw.

He was called up for the Denmark under-19s for the 2023 UEFA European Under-19 Championship qualifiers played in September 2022. He immediately scored on his debut against Georgia on 21 September, beating Sporting CP goalkeeper Papuna Beruashvili one-on-one in the first half, as Denmark won 3–1.

Personal life
Bundgaard is the younger brother of fellow professional football and Denmark youth international Oliver Bundgaard, who preceded him into Randers FC's academy where both were to spend their formative years.

Career statistics

Honours
Randers
 Danish Cup: 2020–21

References

External links
Profile at the Randers FC website

2004 births
Living people
People from Randers
Danish men's footballers
Denmark youth international footballers
Association football midfielders
Danish Superliga players
Randers FC players
Sportspeople from the Central Denmark Region